Sallie Walker Stockard (October 4, 1869 - August 6, 1963) was a professor of history and an author. She was the first woman to receive a degree from the University of North Carolina.

She was born in Saxapahaw in Alamance County, North Carolina. She was the eldest of John Williamson Stockard and Margaret Ann Albright Stockard's six children. Her graduate thesis was a history of Alamance County. She graduated from Guilford College and University of North Carolina. 

She married Perry Green Magness. They had a son and daughter. The couple separated and she generally used her maiden name.

Carole Watterson Troxler's book about Stockard was published in 2021.

Writings
History of Alamance County
The Lily of the Valley, a five act dramatization of the Song of Solomon
History of Guilford County (1902)
The History of Lawrence, Jackson, Independence, and Stone Counties of the Third Judicial District of Arkansas (1904)
Daughter of the Piedmont: Chapel Hill’s First Co-Ed Graduate, unpublished

References

1869 births
1963 deaths